"A Woman's Threat" is a song written, produced, and performed by American R&B singer R. Kelly. It was released as the second single from his fourth solo studio album, TP-2.com (2000), in February 2001. The song charted at number 15 on the US Billboard Bubbling Under Hot 100, number 35 on the Billboard Hot R&B/Hip-Hop Singles & Tracks chart, and number 43 in Germany. A six-minute music video was made for the song.

Music video
The music video is directed by R. Kelly.

Charts

References

2000 songs
Jive Records singles
R. Kelly songs
Song recordings produced by R. Kelly
Songs written by R. Kelly